Solle  is a department or commune of Loroum Province in north-western  Burkina Faso. Its capital lies at the town of Solle.

References

Departments of Burkina Faso
Loroum Province